Calyptocephala attenuata is a species of tortoise beetle in the genus Calyptocephala.

Description 
Calyptocephala attenuata are egg-shaped with the greatest breadth in the middle of the elytra and the rear being more narrow then the front. The elytra are a shiny blood-red color with small dotted lines from front to back. The first two segments of the antennae are red and the other segments are black.

Distribution 
This species can be found in South America and Central America.

References 

Cassidinae
Beetles of Central America
Beetles described in 1919
Beetles of South America